Lithophane gausapata is a species of cutworm or dart moth in the family Noctuidae. It is found in North America.

The MONA or Hodges number for Lithophane gausapata is 9896.

References

Further reading

 
 
 

gausapata
Articles created by Qbugbot
Moths described in 1883